Ángel Pérez (born May 20, 1982 in Río Piedras, Puerto Rico) is a Puerto Rican volleyball player who was a member of the Men's National Team that ended up in sixth place at the 2007 FIVB Men's World Cup in Japan. In the same year the setter claimed the silver medal at the NORCECA Championship in Anaheim. He won with his team the bronze medal at the 2010 Pan-American Cup.

References

External links
 FIVB Profile

1982 births
Living people
People from Río Piedras, Puerto Rico
Puerto Rican men's volleyball players
Volleyball players at the 2007 Pan American Games
Puerto Rican expatriate sportspeople in Romania
Expatriate volleyball players in Romania
Pan American Games competitors for Puerto Rico
21st-century Puerto Rican people